Sandner is a surname. Notable people with the surname include:

David Sandner, American writer
Jack Sandner (1941–2021), American businessman
Olaf Sandner (1923–2013), Venezuelan fencer
Philipp Sandner (born 1980), German economist
Willi Sandner (1911–1984), German speed skater
Wolfgang Sandner (1949–2015), German physicist

See also
Gertrude Fröhlich-Sandner (1926–2008), Austrian politician